Chesnut is a surname. Notable people with the surname include:

Eleanor Chesnut (1868–1905), American Christian missionary
James Chesnut Jr. (1815–1885), planter, lawyer, United States Senator, and general 
Jerry Chesnut (1931–2018), American songwriter
Mary Boykin Chesnut (1823–1886), South Carolina author
William Calvin Chesnut (1873–1962), American judge

See also
Chesnutt
Chestnut (surname)